The Iron Dream is a metafictional 1972 alternate history novel by American author Norman Spinrad. The book has a nested narrative that tells a story within a story. On the surface, the novel presents a post-apocalyptic adventure tale entitled Lord of the Swastika, written by an alternate-history Adolf Hitler shortly before his death in 1953. In this timeline, Hitler emigrated from Germany to the United States in 1919 after the Great War, and used his modest artistic skills to become first a pulp–science fiction illustrator and later a successful writer, telling lurid, purple-prosed, pro-fascism stories under a thin science fiction veneer. The nested narrative is followed by a faux scholarly analysis by a fictional literary critic Homer Whipple which is said to have been written in 1959.

Plot summary
The book's frame narrative and premise is that "after dabbling in radical politics", Adolf Hitler emigrated to the United States in 1919 and became a science fiction illustrator, editor, and author. He wrote his final science fantasy novel Lord of the Swastika in six weeks in 1953, shortly before dying of cerebral hemorrhage (possibly caused by tertiary syphilis); Lord of the Swastika subsequently wins the Hugo Award and the "colorful uniforms" described therein become a regular feature of cosplayers at science fiction conventions. Hitler's other published works include the long-running fanzine Storm and the novels The Master Race, The Thousand Year Rule, and The Triumph of the Will.

In a faux review following the main narrative, presented as written by (fictitious) Dr. Homer Whipple of New York University, we learn more about the background of the alternate history in which Hitler emigrated to the United States. Without Hitler's leadership, the Nazi Party fell apart in 1923 and the Communist Party of Germany succeeded in fomenting a German communist revolution in 1930. As this alternate history continues, there is reference to a "Greater Soviet Union" which took over the United Kingdom in 1948, and whose influence is growing in Latin America by 1959. The fact that Whipple refers to World War I as "the Great War" implies that there has been no equivalent of World War II in this world. The core element in the historical backstory of Lord of the Swastika is a nuclear apocalypse but Whipple gives no indication about such weapons really existing in this alternate reality.

Whipple also discloses that the Empire of Japan has retained its militarism, with reference to its bushido code of conduct, while the United States vacillates against the Greater Soviet Union's ascendancy. Due to the Greater Soviet Union threat, the United States and Japan have a close military and strategic alliance. Japanese militarist values are much admired in the United States. Japan, Australia, New Zealand, and the United States (collectively called the Pacific Pact) are the only major powers standing between the Greater Soviet Union and total control of the globe—yet most Americans seem unable to be roused to deal with the looming Soviet danger. Whipple wonders what the emergence of an American leader like Feric Jaggar, the hero of Lord of the Swastika, could accomplish. Finally, there is a casual mention that, while in this history Nazi Germany never came into being, it is the Soviets who have undertaken a systematic genocide of the Jews of Europe in this world's version of the Holocaust.

Lord of the Swastika is lauded for its qualities as a great work of heroic fantasy. To further hammer the point, in an early edition, actual science fiction writers wrote fictional statements of praise for "Hitler's" writing skills for Spinrad to use as blurbs on the novel's back cover. Irony abounds in Whipple's review, as he argues author Hitler is obviously wrong in assuming that not much more than midnight rallies and phallic symbolism would create a large number of supporters for a movement. "After all", Dr. Whipple says, "it can't happen here", a reference to the political novel It Can't Happen Here.

Novel within the novel—Lord of the Swastika
Lord of the Swastika opens in the year 1142 A.F.—"After Fire", the global nuclear war referred to as the "Time of Fire" which brought about the end of the civilization of the technologically advanced "Ancients" and the current despoliation of most forms of life. The gene pools of almost all life forms are corrupted by the radioactive fallout. Few examples of the baseline human form can be seen, and most of humanity are mutants with blue skins, lizard scales or parrot beaks, or wizened half-breed mutants and normal-seeming but inhuman "Dominators", who desire to rule the ruined world with their mind-controlling powers.

The pure and strong young "Trueman" (so named for the lack of mutations in his DNA) Feric Jaggar returns from the outlands of Borgravia where his family was exiled by the treaty of Karmak with the surrounding mutant states to his ancestral land, the High Republic of Heldon, which was founded on the principles of killing mutants and keeping humanity pure. He arrives only to find its rigor slackened and corrupted by the "Universalists", pawns of the sinister Dominator country Zind, which seeks to corrupt Heldon's pure human gene pool into the mutant diversity that rules the rest of the world. Indeed, in the very first portion of Heldon that Feric enters, the customs fort where entrants are tested to see whether they are pure and free of mutation, he is outraged that mutants are being allowed into Heldon on day-passes, that the fort is under the spell of a Dominator, and that the tests are so lax that impure specimens are being granted citizenship.

In Heldon proper, Feric dines in the "Eagle's Nest" tavern, and mulls over the question of how to change this situation. Should he enter politics or the military? Feric witnesses the oratory of Seph Bogel, leader of the Human Renaissance Party, who speaks eloquently but ineffectually to the crowd about the need for human purity. Fired by his words, Feric is inspired to take control of the listening crowd and leads a mob to the same border post, there to slay the Dominator (or "Dom") who had quietly disguised himself as a clerk to sway the immigration decisions in favor of mutants. At Bogel's invitation, he assumes leadership of the Party, which Feric later renames The Sons of the Swastika, and the two travel on to Walder—the second city of Heldon—to meet the party inner circle and begin the great task.

Their journey is interrupted when their steam-powered vessel is waylaid by the outlaw petrol-powered motorcycle gang, the Black Avengers. Jaggar, however, senses that these men may be of use to his cause and challenges their leader, Stag Stopa. The rules of the Black Avengers only allow a member to challenge the leader, and so he and Bogel are taken back to their headquarters for Feric to be initiated. Feric acquits himself mainly in the drinking of ale and in running the gauntlet of torches on a motorcycle. He and Stopa duel with truncheons, and Feric's truncheon breaks. Desperately he reaches out and picks up the "Great Truncheon of Stag Held" lying nearby—which can only be wielded by a descendant of the last true King of Heldon, Sigmark IV. The Black Avengers immediately pledge fealty to him, and become the "Knights of the Swastika".

From this event, Jaggar assumes a hereditary right to be the leader of Heldon and embarks on a violent crusade for genetic purity, drawing a massive following, staging outdoor rallies and raising an army personally loyal to him. He is elected to the Council and stages a coup d'état when he forces the Council to admit to treason and a Zind plot against Heldon. Confirming his suspicions, the Universalist member of the Council turns out to be a Dom. Feric summarily executes him with the Great Truncheon. Jaggar coerces the Council into granting him complete executive power and then has them shot. Immediately after assuming power Jaggar puts down an imminent coup by Stopa, who has been corrupted by the fleshly pleasures of Zind.

Backed by the army and the adoring multitudes, Feric sets about the great task of re-invigorating the military, ordering the production of tanks and fighter jets, the establishment of the Swastika Squad (SS)—a legion of the purest and most manly men that can be found via the "Classification Camps", which examine all citizens of Heldon (killing the Doms and sterilizing or exiling all relatively impure humans). After repelling a Zind attack through Wolack, Heldon annexes its western and southern neighbors, beginning with Borgravia. In the course of the Helderisation of its neighbors Jaggar orders, at the suggestion of Bors Remler, that all mutants are to be euthanised rather than exiled.

Months later, his scientists report that they are near to rediscovering the secrets of atomic bombs, but that Zind is making efforts to dig up relics of the Ancients, which might salvage its own complement of nuclear weaponry. Noting the damage such weapons had done, Feric orders such research ended, and determines to wipe out Zind and every last Dom before they can unleash the Fire.  Soon enough, Zind begins to rally its troops from their reverse in Wolack. The final invasion of Zind is hard fought: the main Helder force, under the command of Lar Waffing, takes the southwestern oil fields needed for resupply, while the secondary force fights a delaying action against the vast bulk of the Zind army to the north towards the Zind capital, Bora. Needless to say, the forces of Heldon prevail and the Zind army is destroyed and burned, down to the last mindless "Warrior". The central city is reduced to a cinder in a firestorm (akin to the bombing of Dresden in our world).

The last Dom, apparently a leader and with immense mental powers, is discovered hiding in a command bunker. The Dom has anticipated military defeat and, before Feric has the pleasure of killing him, triumphantly reveals that the Doms had salvaged and rearmed one of the ancient nuclear weapons. It is a doomsday weapon, and he triggers the failsafe. After Feric and his cohorts have evacuated Bora, a cobalt bomb detonates, and as the Dom planned, its fallout utterly corrupts the gene pool of Heldon. If any of its citizens, including Feric, reproduce, they will produce the mutants that they had previously sought to obliterate.

Feric orders the sterilization of the entire Heldon nation, including himself, and, in a final desperate gamble, orders the SS scientists to redouble their efforts to develop the next Master Race from cloning the perfect specimens of the SS. Eventually they succeed and millions of the new master race are produced in 'reproduction works' to complete the cleansing of the Earth. At the novel's close, Heldon has mastered interstellar travel. As a consequence, an initial starship, full of 300 of these seven-foot, blond, super-intelligent all-male SS clones in suspended animation, is launched into space to initiate Heldon's own galactic empire. The SS clones also have a clone of Feric to lead them. This inaugural rocket is launched on a voyage to Tau Ceti and will become the first of many.

Analysis

The Iron Dream is a pastiche of Hitler's own life filtered through a fantasy lens, ending not in defeat but in global, indeed galactic, dominion: the Dominators represent the Jews, Heldon represents Germany, Feric Jaggar represents a cliché, wish-fulfillment, almost Platonic ideal self-portrait, and Jaggar's initial return from Borgravia mirrors Hitler's own birth in Austria.

Essentially, the career of the fictional Feric Jaggar is an idealized version of Hitler's real-life career - taking power in Heldon (Germany) and establishing a dictatorial rule dedicated to the ideal of "racial purity"; conquering and annexing his original homeland of Borgravia (Austria); defeating and conquering the countries to his west, with no analogue of a stubbornly resisting Britain; and finally utterly defeating and destroying Zind (Russia) and its capital Bora (Moscow), killing each and every one of the Universalists (Communists) and Doms (Jews). There is in this world no analogue of America, to interfere and foil Jaggar/Hitler's plans for world conquest.

History 
Norman Spinrad was intent on demonstrating just how close Joseph Campbell's The Hero with a Thousand Faces and much science fiction and fantasy literature can be to the racist ideology of Nazi Germany. Spinrad has said that the original version of the novel was 70,000 words long, but that his editor requested he add an extra 10,000 words "to justify the advance and the cover price they wanted to put on it."

Reception
The Iron Dream won critical acclaim, including a Nebula Award nomination and a Prix Tour-Apollo Award. Ursula K. Le Guin wrote in a review that: "We are forced, insofar as we can continue to read the book seriously, to think, not about Adolf Hitler and his historic crimes—Hitler is simply the distancing medium—but to think about ourselves: our moral assumptions, our ideas of heroism, our desires to lead or to be led, our righteous wars. What Spinrad is trying to tell us is that it is happening here." Le Guin also stated that "a novel by Adolf Hitler" cannot "be well-written, complex, (or) interesting", as this "would spoil the bitter joke", but also asked why anyone should "read a book that isn't interesting", arguing that the bad prose of "Hitler's" book may have been due, in part, to the poor quality of Spinrad's own prose.

Leslie Fiedler proposed that Spinrad be considered for the National Book Award in 1973, but apparently won no support from his fellow award judges.

In 1982, the book was "indexed" in West Germany by the Bundesprüfstelle für jugendgefährdende Medien for its alleged promotion of Nazism. Spinrad's publisher, Heyne Verlag, challenged this in court and, until the ban was overturned in 1987, the book could be sold, but not advertised or publicly displayed.

The American Nazi Party put the book on its recommended reading list, despite the satirical intent of the work. In Spinrad's own words:

To make damn sure that even the historically naive and entirely unselfaware reader got the point, I appended a phony critical analysis of Lord of the Swastika, in which the psychopathology of Hitler's saga was spelled out by a tendentious pedant in words of one syllable. Almost everyone got the point... And yet one review appeared in a fanzine that really gave me pause. "This is a rousing adventure story and I really enjoyed it," the gist of it went. "Why did Spinrad have to spoil the fun with all this muck about Hitler?"

See also

 Hypothetical Axis victory in World War II—includes an extensive list of other Wikipedia articles regarding works of Nazi Germany/Axis/World War II alternate history.
 A Man Lies Dreaming — 2014 novel by Lavie Tidhar, in which Hitler, having fled Germany after losing the 1933 election to the Communists, finds work as a private detective in late-thirties London.
 Adolf Hitler in popular culture
 List of nuclear holocaust fiction
 Quark, Strangeness and Charm, Hawkwind album with instrumental song "The Iron Dream"

References

Sources
 Spinrad, Norman. "On Books: The Emperor of Everything". Isaac Asimov's Science Fiction Magazine, January 1988, pp. 173–186.

External links
 

1972 American novels
1972 science fiction novels
American alternate history novels
American fantasy novels
American post-apocalyptic novels
American science fiction novels
Heroic fantasy
Novels about cloning
Metafictional novels
Novels about Adolf Hitler
Novels by Norman Spinrad
Novels about nuclear war and weapons
Post-apocalyptic novels
Sterilization in fiction
Fiction set around Tau Ceti
Novels about World War II alternate histories
Avon (publisher) books